In signal processing, independent component analysis (ICA) is a computational method for separating a multivariate signal into additive subcomponents. This is done by assuming that at most one subcomponent is Gaussian and that the subcomponents are statistically independent from each other. ICA is a special case of blind source separation. A common example application is the "cocktail party problem" of listening in on one person's speech in a noisy room.

Introduction 

Independent component analysis attempts to decompose a multivariate signal into independent non-Gaussian signals. As an example, sound is usually a signal that is composed of the numerical addition, at each time t, of signals from several sources. The question then is whether it is possible to separate these contributing sources from the observed total signal. When the statistical independence assumption is correct, blind ICA separation of a mixed signal gives very good results. It is also used for signals that are not supposed to be generated by mixing for analysis purposes.

A simple application of ICA is the "cocktail party problem", where the underlying speech signals are separated from a sample data consisting of people talking simultaneously in a room. Usually the problem is simplified by assuming no time delays or echoes. Note that a filtered and delayed signal is a copy of a dependent component, and thus the statistical independence assumption is not violated.

Mixing weights for constructing the  observed signals from the  components can be placed in an  matrix. An important thing to consider is that if  sources are present, at least  observations (e.g. microphones if the observed signal is audio) are needed to recover the original signals. When there are an equal number of observations and source signals, the mixing matrix is square. Other cases of underdetermined and overdetermined have been investigated.

That the ICA separation of mixed signals gives very good results is based on two assumptions and three effects of mixing source signals. Two assumptions:
The source signals are independent of each other.
The values in each source signal have non-Gaussian distributions.
Three effects of mixing source signals:
Independence: As per assumption 1, the source signals are independent; however, their signal mixtures are not. This is because the signal mixtures share the same source signals.
Normality: According to the Central Limit Theorem, the distribution of a sum of independent random variables with finite variance tends towards a Gaussian distribution.Loosely speaking, a sum of two independent random variables usually has a distribution that is closer to Gaussian than any of the two original variables. Here we consider the value of each signal as the random variable.
Complexity: The temporal complexity of any signal mixture is greater than that of its simplest constituent source signal.
Those principles contribute to the basic establishment of ICA. If the signals extracted from a set of mixtures are independent, and have non-Gaussian histograms or have low complexity, then they must be source signals.

Defining component independence 
ICA finds the independent components (also called factors, latent variables or sources) by maximizing the statistical independence of the estimated components. We may choose one of many ways to define a proxy for independence, and this choice governs the form of the ICA algorithm. The two broadest definitions of independence for ICA are

 Minimization of mutual information
 Maximization of non-Gaussianity

The Minimization-of-Mutual information (MMI) family of ICA algorithms uses measures like Kullback-Leibler Divergence and maximum entropy.  The non-Gaussianity family of ICA algorithms, motivated by the central limit theorem, uses kurtosis and negentropy.

Typical algorithms for ICA use centering (subtract the mean to create a zero mean signal), whitening (usually with the eigenvalue decomposition), and dimensionality reduction as preprocessing steps in order to simplify and reduce the complexity of the problem for the actual iterative algorithm. Whitening and dimension reduction can be achieved with principal component analysis or singular value decomposition. Whitening ensures that all dimensions are treated equally a priori before the algorithm is run. Well-known algorithms for ICA include infomax, FastICA, JADE, and kernel-independent component analysis, among others. In general, ICA cannot identify the actual number of source signals, a uniquely correct ordering of the source signals, nor the proper scaling (including sign) of the source signals.

ICA is important to blind signal separation and has many practical applications. It is closely related to (or even a special case of) the search for a factorial code of the data, i.e., a new vector-valued representation of each data vector such that it gets uniquely encoded by the resulting code vector (loss-free coding), but the code components are statistically independent.

Mathematical definitions 

Linear independent component analysis can be divided into noiseless and noisy cases, where noiseless ICA is a special case of noisy ICA. Nonlinear ICA should be considered as a separate case.

General definition 

The data are represented by the observed random vector  and the hidden components as the random vector  The task is to transform the observed data  using a linear static transformation  as  into a vector of maximally independent components  measured by some function  of independence.

Generative model

Linear noiseless ICA 

The components  of the observed random vector  are generated as a sum of the independent components , :

weighted by the mixing weights .

Given the model and realizations (samples)  of the random vector , the task is to estimate both the mixing matrix  and the sources . This is done by adaptively calculating the  vectors and setting up a cost function which either maximizes the non-gaussianity of the calculated  or minimizes the mutual information. In some cases, a priori knowledge of the probability distributions of the sources can be used in the cost function.

The original sources  can be recovered by multiplying the observed signals  with the inverse of the mixing matrix , also known as the unmixing matrix. Here it is assumed that the mixing matrix is square. If the number of basis vectors is greater than the dimensionality of the observed vectors, the task is overcomplete but is still solvable with the pseudo inverse.

Linear noisy ICA 

With the added assumption of zero-mean and uncorrelated Gaussian noise , the ICA model takes the form .

Nonlinear ICA 

The mixing of the sources does not need to be linear.

Identifiability 

The independent components are identifiable up to a permutation and scaling of the sources. This identifiability requires that:

 At most one of the sources  is Gaussian,
 The number of observed mixtures, must be at least as large as the number of estimated components : . It is equivalent to say that the mixing matrix  must be of full rank for its inverse to exist.

Binary ICA 

A special variant of ICA is binary ICA in which both signal sources and monitors are in binary form and observations from monitors are disjunctive mixtures of binary independent sources. The problem was shown to have applications in many domains including medical diagnosis, multi-cluster assignment, network tomography and internet resource management.

Let  be the set of binary variables from  monitors and  be the set of binary variables from  sources. Source-monitor connections are represented by the (unknown) mixing matrix , where  indicates that signal from the i-th source can be observed by the j-th monitor. The system works as follows: at any time, if a source  is active and it is connected to the monitor  then the monitor  will observe some activity. Formally we have:

Note that noise is not explicitly modelled, rather, can be treated as independent sources.

This approach has been shown to produce a highly inaccurate result.

Another method is to use dynamic programming: recursively breaking the observation matrix  into its sub-matrices and run the inference algorithm on these sub-matrices. The key observation which leads to this algorithm is the sub-matrix  of  where  corresponds to the unbiased observation matrix of hidden components that do not have connection to the -th monitor. Experimental results from show that this approach is accurate under moderate noise levels.

The Generalized Binary ICA framework introduces a broader problem formulation which does not necessitate any knowledge on the generative model. In other words, this method attempts to decompose a source into its independent components (as much as possible, and without losing any information) with no prior assumption on the way it was generated. Although this problem appears quite complex, it can be accurately solved with a branch and bound search tree algorithm or tightly upper bounded with a single multiplication of a matrix with a vector.

Methods for blind source separation

Projection pursuit 

Signal mixtures tend to have Gaussian probability density functions, and source signals tend to have non-Gaussian probability density functions.  Each source signal can be extracted from a set of signal mixtures by taking the inner product of a weight vector and those signal mixtures where this inner product provides an orthogonal projection of the signal mixtures.  The remaining challenge is finding such a weight vector. One type of method for doing so is projection pursuit.

Projection pursuit seeks one projection at a time such that the extracted signal is as non-Gaussian as possible. This contrasts with ICA, which typically extracts M signals simultaneously from M signal mixtures, which requires estimating a M × M unmixing matrix. One practical advantage of projection pursuit over ICA is that fewer than M signals can be extracted if required, where each source signal is extracted from M signal mixtures using an M-element weight vector.

We can use kurtosis to recover the multiple source signal by finding the correct weight vectors with the use of projection pursuit.

The kurtosis of the probability density function of a signal, for a finite sample, is computed as

The constant 3 ensures that Gaussian signals have zero kurtosis, Super-Gaussian signals have positive kurtosis, and Sub-Gaussian signals have negative kurtosis. The goal of projection pursuit is to maximize the kurtosis, and make the extracted signal as non-normal as possible.

Using kurtosis as a measure of non-normality, we can now examine how the kurtosis of a signal  extracted from a set of M mixtures  varies as the weight vector  is rotated around the origin. Given our assumption that each source signal  is super-gaussian we would expect:
the kurtosis of the extracted signal  to be maximal precisely when .

For multiple source mixture signals, we can use kurtosis and Gram-Schmidt Orthogonalization (GSO) to recover the signals. Given M signal mixtures in an M-dimensional space, GSO project these data points onto an (M-1)-dimensional space by using the weight vector. We can guarantee the independence of the extracted signals with the use of GSO.

 

Rescaling each vector , and let . The kurtosis can thus be written as:

where  is a small constant to guarantee that  converges to the optimal solution. After each update, we normalize , and set , and repeat the updating process until convergence. We can also use another algorithm to update the weight vector .

Another approach is using negentropy instead of kurtosis. Using negentropy is a more robust method than kurtosis, as kurtosis is very sensitive to outliers. The negentropy methods are based on an important property of Gaussian distribution: a Gaussian variable has the largest entropy among all continuous random variables of equal variance. This is also the reason why we want to find the most nongaussian variables. A simple proof can be found in Differential entropy.

y is a Gaussian random variable of the same covariance matrix as x

An approximation for negentropy is
 
A proof can be found in the original papers of Comon; it has been reproduced in the book Independent Component Analysis by Aapo Hyvärinen, Juha Karhunen, and Erkki Oja This approximation also suffers from the same problem as kurtosis (sensitivity to outliers). Other approaches have been developed. 

 and

Based on infomax 

Infomax ICA is essentially a multivariate, parallel version of projection pursuit. Whereas projection pursuit extracts a series of signals one at a time from a set of M signal mixtures, ICA extracts M signals in parallel. This tends to make ICA more robust than projection pursuit.

The projection pursuit method uses Gram-Schmidt orthogonalization to ensure the independence of the extracted signal, while ICA use infomax and maximum likelihood estimate to ensure the independence of the extracted signal. The Non-Normality of the extracted signal is achieved by assigning an appropriate model, or prior, for the signal.

Given the optimal , the signals  have maximum entropy and are therefore independent, which ensures that the extracted signals  are also independent.  is an invertible function, and is the signal model. For this reason, using entropy to extract independent signals is known as infomax.

Consider the entropy of the vector variable , where  is the set of signals extracted by the unmixing matrix . For a finite set of values sampled from a distribution with pdf , the entropy of  can be estimated as:

The joint pdf  can be shown to be related to the joint pdf  of the extracted signals by the multivariate form:

where  is the Jacobian matrix.

therefore,

Since

where  is the absolute value of the determinant of the unmixing matrix . Therefore,

so,

since , and maximizing  does not affect , so we can maximize the function

to achieve the independence of extracted signal.

If there are M marginal pdfs of the model joint pdf  are independent and use the commonly super-gaussian model pdf for the source signals , then we have

In the sum, given an observed signal mixture  , the corresponding set of extracted signals    and source signal model ,  we can find the optimal unmixing matrix , and make the extracted signals independent and non-gaussian. Like the projection pursuit situation, we can use gradient descent method to find the optimal solution of the unmixing matrix.

Based on maximum likelihood estimation 

Maximum likelihood estimation (MLE) is a standard statistical tool for finding parameter values (e.g. the unmixing matrix ) that provide the best fit of some data (e.g., the extracted signals ) to a given a model (e.g., the assumed joint probability density function (pdf)  of source signals).

The ML "model" includes a specification of a pdf, which in this case is the pdf  of the unknown source signals . Using ML ICA, the objective is to find an unmixing matrix that yields extracted signals  with a joint pdf as similar as possible to the joint pdf  of the unknown source signals .

MLE is thus based on the assumption that if the model pdf  and the model parameters  are correct then a high probability should be obtained for the data  that were actually observed. Conversely, if  is far from the correct parameter values then a low probability of the observed data would be expected.

Using MLE, we call the probability of the observed data for a given set of model parameter values (e.g., a pdf  and a matrix ) the likelihood of the model parameter values given the observed data.

We define a likelihood function  of :

Thus, if we wish to find a  that is most likely to have generated the observed mixtures  from the unknown source signals  with pdf  then we need only find that  which maximizes the likelihood . The unmixing matrix that maximizes equation is known as the MLE of the optimal unmixing matrix.

It is common practice to use the log likelihood, because this is easier to evaluate. As the logarithm is a monotonic function, the  that maximizes the function  also maximizes its logarithm . This allows us to take the logarithm of equation above, which yields the log likelihood function

If we substitute a commonly used high-Kurtosis model pdf for the source signals  then we have

This matrix  that maximizes this function is the maximum likelihood estimation.

History and background 

The early general framework for independent component analysis was introduced by Jeanny Hérault and Bernard Ans from 1984, further developed by Christian Jutten in 1985 and 1986, and refined by Pierre Comon in 1991, and popularized in his paper of 1994. In 1995, Tony Bell and Terry Sejnowski introduced a fast and efficient ICA algorithm based on infomax, a principle introduced by Ralph Linsker in 1987.

There are many algorithms available in the literature which do ICA. A largely used one, including in industrial applications, is the FastICA algorithm, developed by Hyvärinen and Oja, which uses the negentropy as cost function. Other examples are rather related to blind source separation where a more general approach is used. For example, one can drop the independence assumption and separate mutually correlated signals, thus, statistically "dependent" signals. Sepp Hochreiter and Jürgen Schmidhuber showed how to obtain non-linear ICA or source separation as a by-product of regularization (1999). Their method does not require a priori knowledge about the number of independent sources.

Applications 

ICA can be extended to analyze non-physical signals. For instance, ICA has been applied to discover discussion topics on a bag of news list archives.

Some ICA applications are listed below:

 optical Imaging of neurons 
 neuronal spike sorting 
 face recognition 
 modelling receptive fields of primary visual neurons 
 predicting stock market prices 
 mobile phone communications 
 colour based detection of the ripeness of tomatoes
 removing artifacts, such as eye blinks, from EEG data.
 predicting decision-making using EEG
 analysis of changes in gene expression over time in single cell RNA-sequencing experiments.
 studies of the resting state network of the brain.
 astronomy and cosmology
 finance

Availability 

ICA can be applied through the following software:

 SAS PROC ICA
 scikit-learn Python implementation sklearn.decomposition.FastICA

See also 

 Blind deconvolution
 Factor analysis
 Hilbert spectrum
 Image processing
 Non-negative matrix factorization (NMF)
 Nonlinear dimensionality reduction
 Projection pursuit
 Varimax rotation

Notes

References

 Comon, Pierre (1994): "Independent Component Analysis: a new concept?", Signal Processing, 36(3):287–314 (The original paper describing the concept of ICA)
 Hyvärinen, A.; Karhunen, J.; Oja, E. (2001): Independent Component Analysis, New York: Wiley,  ( Introductory chapter )
 Hyvärinen, A.; Oja, E. (2000): "Independent Component Analysis: Algorithms and Application", Neural Networks, 13(4-5):411-430. (Technical but pedagogical introduction).
 Comon, P.; Jutten C., (2010): Handbook of Blind Source Separation, Independent Component Analysis and Applications. Academic Press, Oxford UK. 
 Lee, T.-W. (1998): Independent component analysis: Theory and applications, Boston, Mass: Kluwer Academic Publishers, 
 Acharyya, Ranjan (2008): A New Approach for Blind Source Separation of Convolutive Sources - Wavelet Based Separation Using Shrinkage Function   (this book focuses on unsupervised learning with Blind Source Separation)

External links 
 What is independent component analysis? by Aapo Hyvärinen
 Independent Component Analysis: A Tutorial by Aapo Hyvärinen
 A Tutorial on Independent Component Analysis
 FastICA as a package for Matlab, in R language, C++
 ICALAB Toolboxes for Matlab, developed at RIKEN
 High Performance Signal Analysis Toolkit provides C++ implementations of FastICA and Infomax
 ICA toolbox Matlab tools for ICA with Bell-Sejnowski, Molgedey-Schuster and mean field ICA. Developed at DTU.
 Demonstration of the cocktail party problem
 EEGLAB Toolbox ICA of EEG for Matlab, developed at UCSD.
 FMRLAB Toolbox ICA of fMRI for Matlab, developed at UCSD
 MELODIC, part of the FMRIB Software Library.
 Discussion of ICA used in a biomedical shape-representation context
 FastICA, CuBICA, JADE and TDSEP algorithm for Python and more...
 Group ICA Toolbox and Fusion ICA Toolbox
 Tutorial: Using ICA for cleaning EEG signals

Signal estimation
Dimension reduction